Martock is a rural Canadian agricultural community located in the Avon River valley of western Hants County, Nova Scotia.

The community was named after Martock House which was the original estate in the area. Col. John Butler of England was the builder and original owner. Col. Butler named Martock House for Martock, Somerset, England, his birthplace after he came back from the Colonies and was rewarded with the land and slaves by George III. The home was owned by the Sweet family through much of the 19th and all of the 20th century. In 2019, the home was sold to its current owner, A&R Tran, formerly of Vancouver BC.

The hills forming the Avon River valley in Martock, part of the original Martock House Estate, host the Ski Martock ski resort, the only ski resort in southwestern Nova Scotia.

The area is about 70 kilometers from Halifax.

References

Communities in Hants County, Nova Scotia
General Service Areas in Nova Scotia